Barbiani is an Italian surname. Notable people with the surname include:

Andrea Barbiani (1708–1779), Italian painter
Bartolomeo Barbiani (1596–1645), Italian painter 
Giovanni Battista Barbiani (1593–1650), Italian painter, uncle of Andrea

Italian-language surnames